Harrison Petty (born 12 November 1999) is a professional Australian rules footballer playing for the Melbourne Football Club in the Australian Football League (AFL). He was drafted by Melbourne with their third selection and thirty-seventh overall in the 2017 national draft.

Statistics
Updated to the end of the 2022 season.

|-
| 2018 ||  || 35
| 1 || 0 || 0 || 7 || 4 || 11 || 4 || 2 || 0.0 || 0.0 || 7.0 || 4.0 || 11.0 || 4.0 || 2.0
|-
| 2019 ||  || 35
| 10 || 6 || 5 || 55 || 38 || 93 || 43 || 21 || 0.6 || 0.5 || 5.5 || 3.8 || 9.3 || 4.3 || 2.1
|-
| 2020 ||  || 35
| 0 || – || – || – || – || – || – || – || – || – || – || – || – || – || –
|-
| scope=row bgcolor=F0E68C | 2021# ||  || 35
| 19 || 0 || 0 || 107 || 54 || 161 || 68 || 31 || 0.0 || 0.0 || 5.6 || 2.8 || 8.5 || 3.6 || 1.6
|-
| 2022 ||  || 35
| 18 || 1 || 0 || 111 || 80 || 191 || 70 || 41 || 0.1 || 0.0 || 6.2 || 4.4 || 10.6 || 3.9 || 2.3
|- class=sortbottom
! colspan=3 | Career
! 48 !! 7 !! 5 !! 280 !! 176 !! 456 !! 185 !! 95 !! 0.1 !! 0.1 !! 5.8 !! 3.7 !! 9.5 !! 3.9 !! 2.0
|}

Honours and achievements
Team
 AFL premiership player: 2021
 McClelland Trophy: 2021

Individual
 Harold Ball Memorial Trophy: 2019

References

External links

1999 births
Living people
Melbourne Football Club players
Australian rules footballers from South Australia
Melbourne Football Club Premiership players
One-time VFL/AFL Premiership players